Begum Rokeya University, Rangpur (BRUR), formerly Rangpur University, is a government-financed public university in Bangladesh. It is the only general categorised university in Rangpur Division and the second public university in the region. It was named after the feminist writer and social worker Begum Rokeya. It is the 30th public university of Bangladesh. It was established on 12 October 2008 under Begum Rokeya University Act, 2009 (2009–29).

Campus 

The university is between Rangpur Cadet College and Carmichael College in Rangpur. The university has constructed four academic building and started class from August 2011 in the main campus. Currently, the university has 22 departments and almost 7,000 students. It contains three student halls (two male and one female). There is a library and a cafeteria on the campus.

History 
Since 1947, a university in this region has been a long cherished dream. A popular demand for a kind of university that can reach out to a large number of students desiring higher education in this vast region has always been intensely felt but has never been fulfilled. In 2001, the then Prime Minister, Sheikh Hasina, laid the foundations of Rangpur University of Science and Technology. However, later on the establishment was cancelled.

It was not until August 2007 when Fakhruddin Ahmed, chief advisor of the Caretaker Government, agreed in principle to establish a full-fledged university in Rangpur. Fakhruddin Ahmad, in a historic cabinet meeting held in Rangpur on 2 February 2008, took the decision to establish a university in Rangpur. The Rangpur University Ordinance was approved by the cabinet on 15 June 2008. M. Lutfar Rahman was appointed the first vice-chancellor on 20 October 2008. Two days later Hossain Zillur Rahman, the then education and commerce advisor to the Caretaker Government formally inaugurated the university.

Administration
 Chancellor: Md. Abdul Hamid, President, The People's Republic of Bangladesh
 Vice-Chancellor (VC): Professor Dr. Md. Hasibur Rashid
 Pro Vice-Chancellor: Sarifa Salowa Dina

Administrative officers
 Registrar: Engr. Md. Alamgir Chowdhury
 Assistant Registrar: Md. Khairul Islam
 Treasurer: Md. Hasibur Rashid
 Proctor: Md. Golam Rabbani 
 Provosts:
 Komolesh Chandra Sarkar, Bangabandhu Sheikh Mujibur Rahman Hall
 Shafiqur Rahman, Sohid Mukhtar Elahi Hall

Academics

Undergraduate programs
 BSc (Engineering)
 BSc (Hons.)
 B.A. (Hons.)
 B.B.A. (Hons.)
 B.S.S. (Hons.)

Graduate programs
 MSc (Engineering)
 MSc
 M.A.
 M.B.A.
 M.S.S.

Post Graduate programs
 MPhil (MPhil leading to PhD)
 PhD

Other programs
 M.B.A. (Evening)

Faculties and departments
BRUR has 22 departments under six faculties.

Admission
BRUR enrolls undergraduate students. Students who want to get admitted need to pass and compete on the merit list in the admission test which is highly competitive. Admission tests are arranged by the university under authority of admission council for all faculties.

Statistics based on academic year 2014–15 admission:
 Total applicants: 90,402
 Total seats available: 1,258
 Average applicant to seat ratio: 72:1.
 Acceptance rate: 1.39%

Grading system
The academic year consists of two semesters. Academic courses are based on a credit system. Result scale is out of 4. 80℅-100%= 4. Per course includes 3.00 credits and at last semester there is a compulsory thesis for each student including 6 credits.This university has a unique student that is Arafat Hossain.

Central Library and Information Center
The Central Library and Information Center (CLIC) of Begum Rokeya University was established on 12 October 2008 with an aim to support the instructional and research programs of the university. The vice-chancellor opened all activities of CLIC on 19 November 2009.

Initially, CLIC started functioning at the temporary campus of the university (Teachers' Training College, Rangpur). It was shifted to the permanent campus on 19 March 2011. This library and information centre has large reading rooms with huge resources such as books, journals, periodicals etc.
The director is Porimol Chandra Barman.

Institute
Dr. Wazed Research and Training Institute. MPhil & PhD degrees are offered under this institute. The institute is one of the few institutes exclusively designed for MPhil and PhD programs in the country. It also offers MPhil leading to PhD.

Political organisations
 Bangladesh Chatra League
 Jatiyo Chatra Somaj
 Bangladesh Jatiotabadi Chatra Dal
 Student Union
 Somajtantrik Chatro Front

Residential halls

For male students
 Bangabandhu Sheikh Mujibur Rahman Hall
 Sohid Mukhtar Elahi Hall

For female students
 Sheikh Fazilatunnesa Mujib Hall
 Sheikh Hasina Hall (under construction)

Infrastructure

Monuments
 Liberation Monument
 Sohid Minar

Academic
 Four academic buildings
 Central Library
 Dr. Wazed Research and Training Institute (DWRTI)

Administration
 Administrative Building

Facilities
 In-campus medical facilities
 Own bus transportation service
 Central library with Computer lab & seminar libraries in departments
 Cafeteria
 Central Mosque
 Cyber Center

List of vice-chancellors

References

External links
 
 

Begum Rokeya
 
Public universities of Bangladesh
Education in Rangpur, Bangladesh
2008 establishments in Bangladesh
Educational institutions established in 2008